Kôtomo Island is a small island off the Isle of Pines, New Caledonia. It is also spelled as Koutomo, Kutomo, Koutoumo, or Kutumo.

Important Bird Area
A 440 ha tract encompassing the southern part of the island has been recognised as an Important Bird Area (IBA) by BirdLife International because it supports a breeding colony of some 38,000 pairs of wedge-tailed shearwaters.

References

External links
Map of the Isle of Pines, Kôtomo Island, and other islets

Islands of New Caledonia
Important Bird Areas of New Caledonia
Seabird colonies